Drakesbad may refer to:
 Drakesbad, California
 Drakesbad Guest Ranch